John Dark (7 April 1927 – 29 June 2015) was a British film and television producer.

Dark produced Half a Sixpence in 1967 and a series of Edgar Rice Burroughs films, including The Land That Time Forgot and At the Earth's Core, in the 1970s.

Earlier work included associate producer on the Charles K. Feldman spoofs What's New Pussycat? and Casino Royale.

Dark was also executive producer of the film adaptation of the Willy Russell play Shirley Valentine and of the ill-fated BBC soap opera set in Spain, Eldorado.

Select filmography

Rogue's Yarn (1957) - assistant director
Sailor of Fortune (1958) - assistant director
The Strange World of Planet X (1958) - production manager
Missiles from Hell (1958) - production manager
A Cry from the Streets (1958) - production manager
Ferry to Hong Kong (1959) - production manager
Skywatch (1960) - producer
The Wind of Change (1961) - producer
The Greengage Summer (1961) - production manager
The Running Man (1963) - production manager
Jason and the Argonauts (1963) - associate producer
The 7th Dawn (1964) - associate producer
What's New Pussycat (1965) - associate producer
Casino Royale (1967) - associate producer
Half a Sixpence (1967) - executive producer
There's a Girl in My Soup (1970) - executive producer
From Beyond the Grave (1974) - producer
Madhouse (1974) - associate producer
The Beast Must Die (1974) - producer
The Land That Time Forgot (1974) - producer
At the Earth's Core (1976) - producer
The People That Time Forgot (1977) - producer
Warlords of the Deep (1978) - producer
Arabian Adventure (1979) - producer
Slayground (1983) - producer
Shirley Valentine (1989) - executive producer
Stepping Out (1991) - executive producer
Eldorado (1992–93) (Tv series) - executive producer

External links

John Dark at BFI

1927 births
2015 deaths
Businesspeople from London
British film producers
20th-century English businesspeople